As shown in the table below, wxWidgets has a range of bindings for various programming languages that implement some or all of its feature set.

See also 
 List of language bindings for GTK+
 List of language bindings for Qt 4

References 

WxWidgets